Regal Academy is an Italian animated series co-created by Iginio Straffi and Joanne Lee. The series was produced by the Rainbow studio, which at the time was co-owned by Straffi and Viacom. Viacom's Nickelodeon channels broadcast the series worldwide. Rai YoYo aired the series in Italy, and it premiered on Rai YoYo on May 22, 2016, and on Nickelodeon U.S. on August 13, 2016.

The series is a comedic reimagining of a few fairy tale characters. It originated as a dark comedy concept called Twisted Fairy Tales that the Rainbow team designed in 2009. After several years of changes, the show was previewed in 2013, under the working title Royal Academy.

Plot
The series follows Rose, a teenage girl from Earth who discovers a key that leads to FairyTale Land, where fairy tales come to life. She ends up at a school called Regal Academy, where students learn how to become heroes. Rose finds out that she is the granddaughter of the school's headmistress Cinderella. Rose decides to enroll at Regal Academy and learn how to use magic while having adventures with her friends.

Characters

Students

 Rose Cinderella (voiced by Jessica Paquet in the English version, Chiara Francese in the Italian version) is an ordinary girl from Earth who unlocks her fairytale past as the granddaughter of Cinderella. Enrolling in Regal Academy at the request of her grandmother, she befriends Astoria, Joy, Hawk and Travis after they are assigned to be in the same group for a class. Though initially disliked due to her disregard of grades, klutziness, and ditzy mannerism, the school population gradually warms up to her due to her constant optimism and kindness. Like her grandmother, she is a lover of fairytales and shoes, later coming to own a wand that utilises Pumpkin Magic to conjure objects. Rose also later comes to own a pair of signature Cinderella glass slippers, her family's magical item; she was the first one of her friends to unlock her family item. Her romantic interest is Hawk SnowWhite. She almost confessed to him in "Beauty is the Beast". Her famous quote is "Pumpkin seeds!".
 Travis Beast (voiced by Henry Benjamin in the English version, Manuel Meli in the Italian version) is the grandson of the Beast. Like Rose, he lives on Earth. He specialises in art and tends has a sarcastic attitude. When he gets angry, he becomes a real beast and possess immense and uncontrollable strength. Travis later comes to own a wand that utilises Fury Magic that can create powerful tornadoes and hurricanes. His romantic interest is Ling Ling IronFan. He confessed to her in "Beauty is the Beast" when Ling Ling was turned into a monster but his love for her made him realize that it was Ling Ling. His famous quote is "Bad luck beast!". He later owns his family's magical item, the Beast Mask.
 Astoria Rapunzel (voiced by Erica Schroeder in the English version, Giulia Tarquini in the Italian version) is the granddaughter of Rapunzel and living up to her fairytale, has very long wavy purple hair with green highlights at the ends, in reminisce of ivy. She is a perfectionist and a bookworm, aspiring to get perfect grades always, and is known for being the most hardworking princess at Regal Academy. Her hair is alive, and can be used as an extra pair of hands to hold things by wrapping around them. In Season 2, her love interest is Shawn Beast. She later comes to own her family's magical item, the Fire Bangles. Her famous quote is "Oh! my grades!". 
 Hawk SnowWhite (voiced by Billy Bob Thompson in the English version, Alex Polidori in the Italian version) is the grandson of Snow White and just as his grandmother was "the fairest of them all", he is likewise charming and thus highly popular among girls. Like his grandmother, he also has an uncontrollable love for apples. Hawk's exaggerated heroism can sometimes get him and his friends into uncomfortable situations. His romantic interest is Rose Cinderella. He later comes to own his family's magical item, the Mirror Shield. He is mostly heard saying "Attack!" when it's battle time but his usual quotes are "Cool as Ice!" and "Rotten apples!" when things go wrong.
 Joy LeFrog (voiced by Alyson Leigh Rosenfeld in the English version, Emanuela Ionica in the Italian version) is the granddaughter of The Frog Prince (known as Professor LeFrog). She has the ability to switch between her frog and human forms at will. In both her forms, Joy loves all types of insects. Her romantic interest is Esquire Frog. She later comes to own her family's magical item, the Frog Ball. Her famous quote is "Oh my frogs!".
 Ling Ling IronFan is a transfer student from an academy in China. Having grown up trained to be a perfect warrior and an outstanding student, she is completely clueless about fashion, dance, romance and other typical high school group activities. She joined Rose's team after her team was captured by the Snow Queen. She later comes to develop feelings for Travis after he released her from a transformation spell. Her romantic interest is Travis Beast. She later comes to own her family's magical item, the Moon Bow. 
 Esquire Frog is Joy's love interest from Frog Academy. At first, Joy is nervous to talk to him, but she eventually gets the chance to kiss him. In the second season, it is revealed he has an evil rival named Von Frogg. When Esquire was young, he was placed under a curse that turned him into a frog, and he prefers living as a frog to a human.
Shawn Beast is Travis' cousin introduced in season 2. He is Astoria's childhood friend and they appear to have feelings for one another. Astoria rejects him as a dance partner when they are on competing teams, so he partners with Alicia instead.
Gerald Ugly Duckling is the grandson of the Ugly Duckling. He is shy and has a self-esteem problem.
Finn Whale is the grandson of the whale from the story of Sinbad. He is slow and clumsy.
Leena Tom Thumb is the granddaughter of Tom Thumb. She is very tiny and often ends up "squished" flat.
Odette Swan (voiced by Lin Gothoni) is the granddaughter of the Swan Princess from the tale of Swan Lake. She can dance very well.
Pinocchia is the granddaughter of Pinocchio. She is a friendly, smiling living doll who distrusts anyone who lies.
Violet Ogre is the granddaughter of an ogre. She has green skin and is very tall.

Villains
 Vicky Broomstick (voiced by Laurie Hymes in the English version, Eleonora Reti in the Italian version) is a student who carries on evil plans and wishes to be the ultimate fairy tale villain. However, her plans are always thwarted by Rose and her friends, thus her goal is for Rose to be expelled from Regal Academy.
 Cyrus Broomstick (voiced by Michael Henning in the English version, Emanuele Ruzza in the Italian version) is the cousin and friend to Vicky. He is lazy and likes to nap a lot, even during class. Because of his laziness, he is usually coerced into helping with Vicky's schemes.
 Ruby Stepsister (voiced by Brittney Hamilton in the English version, Joy Saltarelli in the Italian version) is a student who is friends with Vicky and usually helps her out with her evil plans (by mostly doing the bulk of the work). She has a crush on Hawk which is another reason she helps Vicky. Ruby's power allows her to tidy up things.
 Kira Snow Queen is the daughter of the Snow Queen and only introduced in season 2. Tasked by her mother to infiltrate the student body by posing as the daughter of Jack Frost, she teams up with Vicky and Cyrus after they find her out. She primarily uses crystal magic that can surpass Hawk's snow magic.

Staff

 Headmistress Cinderella (voiced by Kathryn Cahill in the English version, Aurora Cancian in the Italian version) is the headmistress of Regal Academy. Having been able to hold her own against her stepmother and stepsisters, Cinderella is not afraid to speak her mind now that she's a grandmother. She likes to organize balls and dresses. Much like her granddaughter Rose, Cinderella loves shoes.
 Coach Beast (voiced by H.D. Quinn in the English version, Pierluigi Astore in the Italian version) is a brash gym teacher who yells at students to run a thousand laps or do a thousand pushups. He punishes students if they break the rules of the school. Underneath his tough exterior, Coach Beast has a heart of gold and a secret love for roses. He teaches dragon riding.
 Professor SnowWhite (voiced by Lori Gardner in the English version, Emanuela Baroni in the Italian version) is a strict teacher at Regal Academy, finding herself at odds with Rose and her friends over their adventures. She loves apples and has lots of apple treats on her desk. Snow White teaches etiquette, teamwork, and how to use magical items and powers.
 Doctor LeFrog (voiced by Marc Thompson in the English version, Gianni Giuliano in the Italian version) is the potions professor at the school. With a constant serious look in his eyes, he appears to be funny and ridiculous. Doctor LeFrog is unfazed when something goes wrong and will continue to teach the class because he is absent-minded.
 Magister Rapunzel (voiced by Kayzie Rogers in the English version, Alessandra Cassioli in the Italian version) is the poetry and literature teacher. Because she has spent so much of her time in the tower, Magister Rapunzel excitedly wants to talk and show off her books. Unfortunately she loses control of the conversation and ends up talking to statues, paintings, and even her own hair.
 Professor Wolfram is an anthropomorphic wolf who is always impeccably dressed and is well-mannered. He teaches chivalry and heroism, with his assignments turning into adventures for students. However, there is something dark going on during his assignments.
 Professor Beauty is the art professor at Regal Academy. She is very kind, often having a good word for everyone. Professor Beauty is able to see the positive even in bad, unfortunate situations. She can talk about a piece for hours and hours.
Professor IronFan is Ling Ling's grandmother.

Episodes

Season One (2016–17)

Season Two (2017–18)
The second season of Regal Academy was released on November 5, 2017. It has 26 episodes. 
In the new season, Rose and her friends return from summer holidays and ready to take on new and exciting adventures in Fairy Tale Land. With the help of new magical items and funny pumpkin creatures called the PomPoms, the heroes will undertake new missions and face a mysterious student named Kira, and her mother the evil Snow Queen who wants to trap them all in her snow globes. Regal Academy now airs on Nick Jr.

Broadcast 
In 2015, it was announced that Nickelodeon would globally broadcast the series. Regal Academy premiered in Italy on Rai YoYo on May 21, 2016. In the United States, it began airing on Nickelodeon on August 13, 2016. The second season premiered on Nickelodeon's sister channel Nick Jr. on November 5, 2017.

It also aired on Nickelodeon in Latin America, on Gulli and Nickelodeon Junior in France, on Nickelodeon in the UK and Ireland, on Nickelodeon in Poland (November 14–29, 2016), on ZOOM (since September 4, 2016) in Israel, on Nicktoons in South Africa (November 14, 2016) and a few weeks later on e.tv and etoonz, and on Nickelodeon, TuTy in the Czech Republic and TV5 in the Philippines. in the Middle East, It aired on Nickelodeon as well as MBC3.

References

External links
 Official website
 

2010s animated television series
2010s Italian television series
2016 Italian television series debuts
Italian children's animated action television series
Italian children's animated adventure television series
Italian children's animated comedy television series
Italian children's animated fantasy television series
Italian computer-animated television series
Nickelodeon original programming
Television series by Rainbow S.r.l.
Television series created by Iginio Straffi
Italian-language television shows
English-language television shows
Teen animated television series